Damien Murray (born 1981) is an Irish hurler who played as a left corner-forward for the Offaly senior team.

Murray joined the team during the 2001 National League and immediately became a regular member of the starting fifteen. During his inter-county playing days he enjoyed little success and, apart from a National League (Division 2) winners' medal, he failed to land any honours in the championship. Murray retired from inter-county hurling during the 2008 championship.

At club level Murray is a Leinster winners' medalist and a three-time county club championship winners' medalist with Coolderry.

Career statistics

Club

References

1981 births
Living people
Coolderry hurlers
Offaly inter-county hurlers